SS James M. Wayne was a Liberty ship built in the United States during World War II. She was named after James M. Wayne, an Associate Justice of the Supreme Court of the United States and a United States representative from Georgia.

Construction
James M. Wayne was laid down on 6 July 1942, under a Maritime Commission (MARCOM) contract, MC hull 1489, by J.A. Jones Construction, Brunswick, Georgia, and launched on 13 March 1943.

History
She was allocated to the Waterman Steamship Company on 7 May 1943. On 19 September 1944, she collided with the Liberty ship  near Cardiff, Wales. She was repaired in Cardiff, and left on 30 September 1944. On 24 April 1948, she was laid up in the National Defense Reserve Fleet in Wilmington, North Carolina. On 21 February 1967, she was sold to Union Minerals & Alloys for $48,259, and scrapped.

References

Bibliography

 
 
 
 
 

 

Liberty ships
Ships built in Brunswick, Georgia
1943 ships
Wilmington Reserve Fleet